Jerry Leon Wallace (December 15, 1928 – May 5, 2008) was an American country and pop singer. Between 1958 and 1964, Wallace charted nine hits on the Billboard Hot 100, including the No. 8 "Primrose Lane" that was later used as the theme song for the television series The Smith Family. He made his debut on the country music charts in 1965, entering it thirty-five times between then and 1980. In that timespan, Wallace charted within the country Top Ten four times. His only number one song was "If You Leave Me Tonight I'll Cry," a song which gained popularity after it was used in an episode of the 1970s TV series Night Gallery.

Biography
Wallace was born in Guilford, Missouri, United States.

Wallace performed for the eighth Cavalcade of Jazz concert held at Wrigley Field in Los Angeles which was produced by Leon Hefflin, Sr. on June 1, 1952.  Also featured that day were Roy Brown and His Mighty Men, Anna Mae Winburn and Her Sweethearts, Toni Harper, Louis Jordan, Jimmy Witherspoon and Josephine Baker.

"Primrose Lane" was his biggest hit, reaching No. 8 pop and No. 12 R&B in the US, selling over one million copies and awarded a gold disc. After his song "If You Leave Me Tonight I'll Cry" was featured in the 1972 Night Gallery episode "The Tune in Dan's Cafe," the song became a No. 1 hit on the Billboard magazine Hot Country Singles chart that August, spending two weeks at the top of the chart, crossing to No. 38 pop. "How The Time Flies" was Wallace's first big hit, reaching No. 11 pop and No. 11 R&B.

In 1972, he gained nomination for the Country Music Association Award as Male Vocalist of the Year, and his song "To Get To You" gained nomination for Single of the Year.

Wallace died on May 5, 2008 in Corona, California, after suffering congestive heart failure. A United States Navy veteran of World War II, Wallace was buried at Riverside National Cemetery in Riverside, California.

Discography

Albums

Singles

A"In the Misty Moonlight" also peaked at No. 2 on the Pop-Standard Singles chart.

References

External links
Biography at Oldies.com

 

1928 births
2008 deaths
Apex Records artists
American country singer-songwriters
American male singer-songwriters
Burials at Riverside National Cemetery
Challenge Records artists
Class Records artists
People from Corona, California
People from Nodaway County, Missouri
20th-century American singers
Singer-songwriters from California
Singer-songwriters from Missouri
Country musicians from California
Country musicians from Missouri
20th-century American male singers